John Arthur Johnson (March 31, 1878 – June 10, 1946), nicknamed the "Galveston Giant", was an American boxer who, at the height of the Jim Crow era, became the first black world heavyweight boxing champion (1908–1915). He is widely regarded as one of the most influential boxers in history, and his 1910 fight against James J. Jeffries was dubbed the "fight of the century". According to filmmaker Ken Burns, 
 "for more than thirteen years, Jack Johnson was the most famous and the most notorious black boxer on Earth". 
Transcending boxing, he became part of the culture and history of racism in the United States.

In 1912, Johnson opened a successful and luxurious "black and tan" (desegregated) restaurant and nightclub, which in part was run by his wife, a white woman. Major newspapers of the time soon claimed that Johnson was attacked by the government only after he became famous as a black man married to a white woman, and was linked to other white women. Johnson was arrested on charges of violating the Mann Act—forbidding one to transport a woman across state lines for "immoral purposes"—a racially motivated charge that embroiled him in controversy for his relationships, including marriages, with white women. Sentenced to a year in prison, Johnson fled the country and fought boxing matches abroad for seven years until 1920 when he served his sentence at the federal penitentiary at Leavenworth.

Johnson continued taking paying fights for many years, and operated several other businesses, including lucrative endorsement deals. He died in a car crash in 1946 at the age of 68. He is buried at Graceland Cemetery in Chicago. In 2018 Johnson, with some instigation from actor Sylvester Stallone, was formally pardoned by U.S. president Donald Trump.

Early life
Johnson was born on March 31, 1878, the third child of nine born to Henry and Tina Johnson, former slaves who worked service jobs as a janitor and a dishwasher. His father had served as a civilian teamster of the Union's 38th Colored Infantry. He was described by his son as the "most perfect physical specimen that he had ever seen", although Henry had been left with an atrophied right leg from his service in the war.

Growing up in Galveston, Texas, Johnson attended five years of school. As a young man, Johnson was frail, though, like all of his siblings, he was expected to work.

Although Johnson grew up in the South, he said that segregation was not an issue in the somewhat secluded city of Galveston, as everyone living in the 12th Ward was poor and went through the same struggles. Johnson remembers growing up with a "gang" of white boys, in which he never felt victimized or excluded. Remembering his childhood, Johnson said: "As I grew up, the white boys were my friends and my pals. I ate with them, played with them and slept at their homes. Their mothers gave me cookies, and I ate at their tables. No one ever taught me that white men were superior to me."

After Johnson quit school, he began a job working at the local docks. He made several other attempts at working other jobs around town until one day he made his way to Dallas, finding work at the race track exercising horses. Jack stuck with this job until he found a new apprenticeship with a carriage painter by the name of Walter Lewis. Lewis enjoyed watching friends spar, and Johnson began to learn how to box. Johnson later declared that it was thanks to Lewis that he became a boxer.

At 16, Johnson moved to New York City and found living arrangements with Barbados Joe Walcott, a welterweight fighter from the West Indies. Johnson again found work exercising horses for the local stable, until he was fired for exhausting a horse. On his return to Galveston, he was hired as a janitor at a gym owned by German-born heavyweight fighter Herman Bernau. Johnson eventually put away enough money to buy boxing gloves, sparring every chance he got.

At one point, Johnson was arrested for brawling with a man named Davie Pearson, a "grown and toughened" man who accused Johnson of turning him in to the police over a game of craps. When both of them were released from jail, they met at the docks, and Johnson beat Pearson before a large crowd. Johnson then fought in a summer boxing league against a man named John "Must Have It" Lee. Because prize fighting was illegal in Texas, the fight was broken up and moved to the beach, where Johnson won his first fight and a prize of one dollar and fifty cents.

Boxing career
Johnson made his debut as a professional boxer on November 1, 1898, in Galveston, when he knocked out Charley Brooks in the second round of a 15-round bout, billed for “The Texas State Middleweight Title". In his third pro fight on May 8, 1899, he faced "Klondike" (John W. Haynes, or Haines), an African American heavyweight known as "The Black Hercules", in Chicago. Klondike (so called as he was considered a rarity, like the gold in the Klondike), who had declared himself the "Black Heavyweight Champ", won on a technical knockout (TKO) in the fifth round of a scheduled six-rounder. The two fighters met twice again in 1900, with the first rematch resulting in a draw, as both fighters were on their feet at the end of 20 rounds. Johnson won the third fight by a TKO when Klondike refused to come out for the 14th round. Johnson did not claim Klondike's unrecognized title.

Joe Choynski

On February 25, 1901, Johnson fought Joe Choynski in Galveston. Choynski, a popular and experienced heavyweight, knocked out Johnson in the third round. Prizefighting was illegal in Texas at the time and they were both arrested. Bail was set at $5,000, which neither could afford. The sheriff permitted both fighters to go home at night so long as they agreed to spar in the jail cell. Large crowds gathered to watch the sessions. After 23 days in jail, their bail was reduced to an affordable level and a grand jury refused to indict either man. Johnson later stated that he learned his boxing skills during that jail time. The two would remain friends.

Johnson attested that his success in boxing came from the coaching he received from Choynski. The aging Choynski saw natural talent and determination in Johnson and taught him the nuances of defense, stating: "A man who can move like you should never have to take a punch".

Top contender
Johnson beat former black heavyweight champion Frank Childs on October 21, 1902. Childs had twice won the black heavyweight title and continued to claim that he was the true black champion despite having lost his title in a bout with George Byers and then, after retaking the title from Byers, losing it again to Denver Ed Martin. He also claimed the unrecognized black heavyweight title as well. Johnson won by a TKO in the 12th round of the scheduled 20-rounder, when Childs's seconds signaled he could not go on, claiming a dislocated elbow. The defeat by Johnson forever ended Childs's pretensions to the black heavyweight crown.

World colored heavyweight champ

By 1903, though Johnson's official record showed him with nine wins against three losses, five draws and two no contests, he had won at least 50 fights against both white and black opponents. Johnson won his first title on February 3, 1903, beating Denver Ed Martin on points in a 20-round match for the World Colored Heavyweight Championship. Johnson held the title until it was vacated when he won the world heavyweight title from Tommy Burns in Sydney, Australia on Boxing Day 1908. His reign of 2,151 days was the third longest in the 60-year-long history of the colored heavyweight title. Only Harry Wills at 3,103 days and Peter Jackson at 3,041 days held the title longer.  A three-time colored heavyweight champion, Wills held the title for a total of 3,351 days.

Johnson defended the colored heavyweight title 17 times, which was second only to the 26 times Wills defended the title. While colored champ, he defeated colored ex-champs Denver Ed Martin and Frank Childs again and beat future colored heavyweight champs Sam McVey three times and Sam Langford once. He beat Langford on points in a 15-rounder and never gave him another shot at the title, when he was either colored champ or the world heavyweight champ.

Johnson, Jeanette and Langford
Johnson fought Joe Jeanette a total of seven times, all during his reign as colored champion before he became the world's heavyweight champion, winning four times and drawing twice (three of the victories and one draw were newspaper decisions). In their first match in 1905, they had fought to a draw, but in their second match on November 25, 1905, Johnson lost as he was disqualified in the second round of a scheduled six-round fight. Johnson continued to claim the title because of the disqualification.

After Johnson became the first African-American Heavyweight Champion of the World on December 26, 1908, his World Colored Heavyweight Championship was vacated. Jeanette fought Sam McVey for the title in Paris on February 20, 1909, and was beaten, but he later took the title from McVey in a 49-round bout on April 17 of that year in Paris for a $6,000 purse. Sam Langford subsequently claimed the title during Jeanette's reign after Johnson refused to defend the World Heavyweight Championship against him. Eighteen months later, Jeanette lost the title to Langford.

During his reign as world champion, Johnson never again fought Jeanette, despite numerous challenges, and avoided Langford, who won the colored title a record five times. In 1906 Jack Johnson fought Sam Langford. Langford took severe punishment and was knocked down 3 times; however, he lasted the 15-round distance.

On November 27, 1945, Johnson finally stepped back into the ring with Joe Jeanette. The 67-year-old Johnson squared off against the 66-year-old Jeanette in an exhibition held at a New York City rally to sell war bonds. Fellow former colored heavyweight champ Harry Wills also participated in the exhibition.

World heavyweight champion
Johnson's efforts to win the world heavyweight title were initially thwarted, as at the time world heavyweight champion James J. Jeffries refused to face him, and retired instead. However, Johnson did fight former champion Bob Fitzsimmons in July 1907, and knocked him out in two rounds.

Johnson finally won the world heavyweight title on December 26, 1908, a full six years after lightweight champion Joe Gans became the first African American boxing champion. Johnson's victory over the reigning world champion, Canadian Tommy Burns, at the Sydney Stadium in Australia, came after following Burns around the world for two years and taunting him in the press for a match. Burns agreed to fight Johnson only after promoters guaranteed him $30,000. The fight lasted fourteen rounds before being stopped by the police in front of over 20,000 spectators, and Johnson was named the winner.

After Johnson's victory over Burns, racial animosity among whites ran so deep that some, including renowned American author Jack London, called for a "Great White Hope" to take the title away from Johnson. While Johnson was heavyweight champion, he was covered more in the press than all other notable black men combined. The lead-up to the bout was peppered with racist press against Johnson. Even the New York Times wrote of the event, "If the black man wins, thousands and thousands of his ignorant brothers will misinterpret his victory as justifying claims to much more than mere physical equality with their white neighbors." As title holder, Johnson thus had to face a series of fighters each billed by boxing promoters as a "great white hope", often in exhibition matches. In 1909, he beat Tony Ross, Al Kaufman, and the middleweight champion Stanley Ketchel.

The match with Ketchel was originally thought to have been an exhibition, and in fact it was fought by both men that way, until the 12th round, when Ketchel threw a right to Johnson's head, knocking him down. Quickly regaining his feet, and very annoyed, Johnson immediately dashed straight at Ketchell and threw a single punch, an uppercut, a punch for which he was famous, to Ketchel's jaw, knocking him out. The punch knocked out Ketchell's front teeth; Johnson can be seen on film removing them from his glove, where they had been embedded.

"Fight of the Century"

In 1910, former undefeated heavyweight champion James J. Jeffries came out of retirement to challenge Johnson, saying "I am going into this fight for the sole purpose of proving that a white man is better than a Negro". He had not fought in six years and he also had to lose well over 100 pounds to get back to his championship fighting weight. Efforts to persuade Jeffries to "retrieve the honor of the white race" began immediately after the Burns–Johnson fight. Initially Jeffries had no interest in the fight, being quite happy as an alfalfa farmer. On October 29, 1909, Johnson and Jeffries signed an agreement to "box for the heavyweight championship of the world" and called promoters to bid for the right to orchestrate the event.

In early December 1909, Johnson and Jeffries selected a bid from the nation's top boxing promoters—Tex Rickard and John Gleason. The bid guaranteed a purse of $101,000 to be divided 75 percent to the winner and 25 percent to the loser, as well as two-thirds of the revenues collected from the sales of the right to film the fight (each boxer received one third of the equity rights). Although it was well understood that a victory for Jeffries was likely to be more profitable than a victory for Johnson, there were no doubts that the event would produce record profits. Legal historian Barak Orbach argues that in "an industry that promoted events through the dramatization of rivalries, a championship contest between an iconic representative of the white race and the most notorious [black fighter] was a gold mine".

Jeffries mostly remained hidden from media attention until the day of the fight, while Johnson soaked up the spotlight. John L. Sullivan, who made boxing championships a popular and esteemed spectacle, stated that Johnson was in such good physical shape compared to Jeffries that he would only lose if he had a lack of skill on the day of the fight. Before the fight, Jeffries remarked, "It is my intention to go right after my opponent and knock him out as soon as possible". While his wife added, "I'm not interested in prizefighting but I am interested in my husband's welfare, I do hope this will be his last fight". Johnson's words were "May the best man win".

Racial tension was brewing in the lead up to the fight and to prevent any harm from coming to either boxer, guns were prohibited within the arena along with the sale of alcohol and anyone who was under the effects of alcohol. Apples and all other potential weapons were barred. Behind the racial attitudes which were being instigated by the media was a major investment in gambling for the fight, with 10–7 odds in favor of Jeffries.

The fight took place on July 4, 1910, in front of 20,000 people, at a ring which was built just for the occasion in downtown Reno, Nevada. Jeffries proved unable to impose his will on the younger champion and Johnson dominated the fight. By the 15th round, after Jeffries had been knocked down twice for the first time in his career, Jeffries' corner threw in the towel to end the fight and prevent Jeffries from having a knockout on his record.

Johnson later remarked he knew the fight was over in the 4th round when he landed an uppercut and saw the look on Jeffries face, stating, "I knew what that look meant. The old ship was sinking". Afterwards, Jeffries was humbled by the loss and what he had seen of Johnson in their match. "I could never have whipped Johnson at my best", Jeffries said. "I couldn't have hit him. No, I couldn't have reached him in 1,000 years".

The "Fight of the Century" earned Johnson $65,000 (over $ million in  dollars) and silenced the critics, who had belittled Johnson's previous victory over Tommy Burns as "empty", claiming that Burns was a false champion since Jeffries had retired undefeated. John L. Sullivan commented after the fight that Johnson won deservedly, fairly and convincingly,

Riots and aftermath

The outcome of the fight triggered race riots that evening—the Fourth of July—all across the United States, from Texas and Colorado to New York and Washington, D.C. Johnson's victory over Jeffries had dashed white dreams of finding a "great white hope" to defeat him. Many whites felt humiliated by the defeat of Jeffries.

Black Americans, on the other hand, were jubilant and celebrated Johnson's great victory as a victory for racial advancement. Black poet William Waring Cuney later highlighted the black reaction to the fight in his poem "My Lord, What a Morning". Around the country, blacks held spontaneous parades and gathered in prayer meetings.

Race riots, initiated by whites and blacks, erupted in New York, Baltimore, Pittsburgh, Philadelphia, New Orleans, Atlanta, St. Louis, Little Rock and Houston. In all, riots occurred in more than 25 states and 50 cities. At least twenty people were killed in the riots and hundreds more were injured.

Film of the bout
The Johnson–Jeffries Fight film received more public attention in the United States than any other film to date and for the next five years, until the release of The Birth of a Nation. In the United States, many states and cities banned the exhibition of the Johnson–Jeffries film. The movement to censor Johnson's victory took over the country within three days after the fight.

Two weeks after the match former President Theodore Roosevelt, an avid boxer and fan, wrote an article for The Outlook in which he supported banning not just moving pictures of boxing matches, but a complete ban on all prize fights in the US. He cited the "crookedness" and gambling that surrounded such contests and that moving pictures have "introduced a new method of money getting and of demoralization". The controversy surrounding the film motivated Congress to ban distribution of all prizefight films across state lines in 1912; the ban was lifted in 1940.

In 2005, the film of the Jeffries–Johnson "Fight of the Century" was entered into the United States National Film Registry as being worthy of preservation.

The six fights for which the major films were made, starring Johnson, were
 Johnson–Burns, released in 1908
 Johnson–Ketchel, released in 1909
 Johnson–Jeffries, released in 1910
 Johnson–Flynn, released in 1912
 Johnson–Moran, released in 1914
 Johnson–Willard, released in 1915

Maintaining the Color Bar
The color bar remained in effect even under Johnson. Once he was the world's heavyweight champ, Johnson did not fight a black opponent for the first five years of his reign. He denied matches to black heavyweights Joe Jeanette, one of his successors as colored heavyweight champ, Sam Langford, who beat Jeanette for the colored title and the young Harry Wills, who was colored heavyweight champ during the last year of Johnson's reign as world's heavyweight champ.

Blacks were not given a chance at the title because Johnson maintained that he could make more money fighting white boxers. In August 1913, as Johnson neared the end of his reign as world heavyweight champ, there were rumors that he had agreed to fight Langford in Paris for the title, but it did not happen. Johnson alleged that Langford was unable to raise the $30,000 for his guarantee.

Because black boxers with the exception of Johnson had been barred from fighting for the heavyweight championship, Johnson's refusal to fight African-Americans offended the African-American community since the opportunity to fight top white boxers was rare. Jeanette criticized Johnson, saying, "Jack forgot about his old friends after he became champion and drew the color line against his own people."

Johnson v. Johnson
When Johnson finally agreed to take on a black opponent in late 1913, it was not Sam Langford the current colored heavyweight champ that he gave the title shot to. Instead, Johnson chose to take on Battling Jim Johnson, a lesser-known boxer who in 1910 had lost to Langford and had a draw and loss via KO to Sam McVey, the former colored champ. Battling Jim fought former colored champ Joe Jeanette four times between July 19, 1912, and January 21, 1913, and lost all four fights. The only fighter of note who he did beat during that period was the future colored champ Big Bill Tate, whom he KO-ed in the second round of a scheduled 10-round bout. It was Tate's third pro fight.

In November 1913, the International Boxing Union had declared the world heavyweight title held by Jack Johnson to be vacant. The fight, scheduled for 10 rounds, was held on December 19, 1913, in Paris. It was the first time in history that two blacks had fought for the world heavyweight championship.

While the Johnson v. Johnson fight had been billed as a world heavyweight title match, in many ways, it resembled an exhibition. A sportswriter from the Indianapolis Star at the fight reported that the crowd became unruly when it was apparent that neither boxer was putting up a fight.

Jack Johnson, the heavyweight champion, and Battling Jim Johnson, another colored pugilist, of Galveston, Texas, met in a 10-round contest here tonight, which ended in a draw. The spectators loudly protested throughout that the men were not fighting, and demanded their money back. Many of them left the hall. The organizers of the fight explained the fiasco by asserting that Jack Johnson's left arm was broken in the third round. There is no confirmation of a report that Jack Johnson had been stabbed and no evidence at the ringside of such an accident. During the first three rounds he was obviously playing with his opponent. After that it was observed that he was only using his right hand. When the fight was over he complained that his arm had been injured. Doctors who made an examination, certified to a slight fracture of the radius of the left arm. The general opinion is that his arm was injured in a wrestling match early in the week, and that a blow tonight caused the fracture of the bone.

Because of the draw, Jack Johnson kept his championship. After the fight, he explained that his left arm was injured in the third round and he could not use it.

Title loss

On April 5, 1915, Johnson lost his title to Jess Willard, a working cowboy from Kansas who started boxing when he was 27 years old. With a crowd of 25,000 at Oriental Park Racetrack in Havana, Cuba, Johnson was knocked out in the 26th round of the scheduled 45 round fight. Johnson, although having won almost every round, began to tire after the 20th round, and was visibly hurt by heavy body punches from Willard in rounds preceding the 26th-round knockout.

Johnson is said by many a year after the fight to have spread rumors that he took a dive, but Willard is widely regarded as having won the fight outright. Many people thought Johnson purposely threw the fight because Willard was white, in an effort to have his Mann Act charges dropped. Willard ironically responded, "If he was going to throw the fight, I wish he'd done it sooner. It was hotter than hell out there."

Post-championship
After losing his world heavyweight championship, Johnson never again fought for the colored heavyweight crown.  His popularity remained strong enough that he recorded for Ajax Records in the 1920s. Johnson continued fighting, but age was catching up with him. He fought professionally until 1938 at age 60 when he lost 7 of his last 9 bouts, losing his final fight to Walter Price by a 7th-round TKO. It is often suggested that any bouts after the age of 40—which was a very venerable age for boxing in those days—not be counted on his actual record, since he was performing in order to make a living.

He also indulged in what was known as "cellar" fighting, where the bouts, unadvertised, were fought for private audiences, usually in cellars or other unrecognized places. There are surviving photographs of one of these fights. Johnson made his final ring appearance at age 67 on November 27, 1945, fighting three one-minute exhibition rounds against two opponents, Joe Jeanette and John Ballcort, in a benefit fight card for U.S. War Bonds.

Boxing style
Throughout his career, Johnson built a unique fighting style of his own, which was not customary in boxing during this time. Though he would typically strike first, he would fight defensively, waiting for his opponents to tire out, becoming more aggressive as the rounds went on. He often fought to punish his opponents over the course of the bout rather than going for the knockout, and would continuously dodge their punches. He would then quickly strike back with a blow of his own. Johnson often made his fights look effortless, and as if he had much more to offer, but when pushed he could also display some powerful moves and punches. There are films of his fights in which he can be seen holding up his opponent, who otherwise might have fallen, until he recovered.

Personal life

Johnson earned considerable sums endorsing various products, including patent medicines, and had several expensive hobbies such as automobile racing and tailored clothing, as well as purchasing jewelry and furs for his wives. He challenged champion racer Barney Oldfield to an auto race at the Sheepshead Bay, Brooklyn dirt track. Oldfield easily defeated Johnson. Once, when he was pulled over for a $50 speeding ticket, he gave the officer a $100 bill; when the officer protested that he could not make change for that much, Johnson told him to keep the change as he was going to make his return trip at the same speed. In 1920, Johnson opened the Club Deluxe, a Black and Tan night club in Harlem; he sold it three years later to a gangster, Owney Madden, who renamed it the Cotton Club.

Johnson's behavior was looked down upon by the African-American community, especially by the black scholar Booker T. Washington, who said it "is unfortunate that a man with money should use it in a way to injure his own people, in the eyes of those who are seeking to uplift his race and improve its conditions, I wish to say emphatically that Jack Johnson's actions did not meet my personal approval and I am sure they do not meet with the approval of the colored race."

Johnson flouted conventions regarding the social and economic "place" of blacks in American society. As a black man, he broke a powerful taboo in consorting with white women and would verbally taunt men (both white and black) inside and outside the ring. When asked the secret of his staying power by a reporter who had watched a succession of women parade into, and out of, the champion's hotel room, Johnson supposedly said "Eat jellied eels and think distant thoughts".

In 1911, Johnson, through an acquaintance, attempted to become a Freemason in Dundee. He was initiated as an Entered Apprentice at Forfar and Kincardine Lodge No 225 in the city. However, there was some opposition to his membership from within the lodge, but mainly from the Grand Lodge who tried to stop the initiation from going ahead due to most Grand Lodges in the USA threatening to withdraw their Scottish Grand Lodge representation if it did. The Forfarshire Lodge was suspended by the Grand Lodge of Scotland, and Johnson's fees were returned to him and his admission was ruled illegal.

In July 1912, Johnson opened an interracial nightclub in Chicago called Café de Champion.

Johnson wrote two memoirs of his life: Mes combats in 1914 and Jack Johnson in the Ring and Out in 1927.

In 1943, Johnson attended at least one service at the Angelus Temple in Los Angeles, California. In a public conversion, while Detroit, Michigan, burned in race riots, he professed his faith to Christ in a service conducted by evangelist Aimee Semple McPherson. She embraced him as "he raised his hand in worship".

Marriages

Johnson engaged in various relationships, including three documented marriages. All of his documented wives were white. At the height of his career, Johnson was excoriated by the press for his flashy lifestyle and for having married white women.

According to Johnson's 1927 autobiography, he married Mary Austin, a black woman from Galveston, Texas. No record exists of this marriage.

While in Philadelphia in 1903, Johnson met Clara Kerr, a black prostitute. According to Johnson's autobiography, Kerr left him for Johnson's friend, a racehorse trainer named William Bryant. They stole Johnson's jewelry and clothing when they left. Johnson tracked the couple down and had Kerr arrested on burglary charges. Johnson and Kerr reconciled for a while before she left him again.

During a three-month tour of Australia in 1907, Johnson had a brief affair with Alma "Lola" Toy, a white woman from Sydney. Johnson confirmed to an American journalist that he intended to marry Toy. When The Referee printed Johnson's plans to marry Toy, it caused controversy in Sydney. Toy demanded a retraction and later won a libel lawsuit from the newspaper.

After returning from Australia, Johnson said that "the heartaches which Mary Austin and Clara Kerr caused me led me to forswear colored women and to determine that my lot henceforth would be cast only with white women."

Johnson met Etta Terry Duryea, a Brooklyn socialite and former wife of Clarence Duryea, at a car race in 1909. In 1910, Johnson hired a private investigator to follow Duryea after suspecting she was having an affair with his chauffeur. On Christmas Day, Johnson confronted Duryea and beat her to the point of hospitalization. They reconciled and were married on January 18, 1911. Prone to depression, her condition worsened due to Johnson's abuse and infidelity in addition to the hostile reaction to their interracial relationship. Duryea attempted suicide twice before she died from a self-inflicted gunshot wound on September 11, 1912.

In the summer of 1912, Johnson met Lucille Cameron, an 18-year-old prostitute from Minneapolis who relocated to Chicago, at his nightclub Café de Champion. Johnson hired her as his stenographer, but shortly after Duryea's funeral, they were out in public as a couple. They married on December 3, 1912 at 3:00 p.m. Cameron filed for divorce in 1924 due to his infidelity.

Johnson met Irene Pineau at the race track in Aurora, Illinois in 1924. After she divorced her husband the following year, they were married in Waukegan in August 1925. Johnson and Pineau were together until his death in 1946. When asked by a reporter at Johnson's funeral what she had loved about him, she replied: "I loved him because of his courage. He faced the world unafraid. There wasn't anybody or anything he feared."

Prison sentence

On October 18, 1912, Johnson was arrested on the grounds that his relationship with Lucille Cameron violated the Mann Act against "transporting women across state lines for immoral purposes" due to her being an alleged prostitute. Her mother also swore that her daughter was insane. Cameron, soon to become his second wife, refused to cooperate and the case fell apart. Less than a month later, Johnson was arrested again on similar charges.

This time, the woman, another alleged prostitute named Belle Schreiber, with whom he had been involved in 1909 and 1910, testified against him. In the courtroom of Kenesaw Mountain Landis, the future Commissioner of Baseball who perpetuated the baseball color line until his death, Johnson was convicted by an all-white jury in June 1913, despite the fact that the incidents used to convict him took place before passage of the Mann Act. He was sentenced to a year and a day in prison.

Johnson skipped bail and left the country, joining Lucille in Montreal on June 25, before fleeing to France. To flee to Canada, Johnson posed as a member of a black baseball team. For the next seven years, they lived in exile in Europe, South America and Mexico. Johnson returned to the U.S. on July 20, 1920. He surrendered to federal agents at the Mexican border and was sent to the United States Penitentiary, Leavenworth to serve his sentence in September 1920. He was released on July 9, 1921.

Presidential pardon 
President Donald Trump granted Johnson a posthumous presidential pardon after recurring proposals to grant one had not been acted on by previous administrations.  In April 2018, Trump announced that he was considering granting a full pardon to Johnson after speaking with a World Boxing Council committee, along with actor Sylvester Stallone. Trump pardoned Johnson on May 24, 2018, 105 years after his conviction, during a ceremony which included special guests Sylvester Stallone (actor), Deontay Wilder (then current WBC Champion), Lennox Lewis (WBC Former Champion), Mauricio Sulaiman (WBC President), Linda Bell Haywood (Johnson's great-great niece) and Hector Sulaiman (President of the Board of Advisors of Scholas Occurrentes), .

WBC president Jose Sulaiman had reached out to presidential administrations dating back to Ronald Reagan's requesting a pardon. A bill which requested that President George W. Bush pardon Johnson passed the House in 2008, but failed to pass in the Senate. In April 2009, Senator John McCain, along with Representative Peter King, film maker Ken Burns and Johnson's great-niece, Linda Haywood, requested a presidential pardon for Johnson from President Barack Obama. In July of that year, Congress passed a resolution calling on President Obama to issue a pardon.

In 2016, another petition for Johnson's pardon was issued by McCain, King, Senator Harry Reid and Congressman Gregory Meeks to President Obama, marking the 70th anniversary since the boxer's death. This time, the petitioners cited a provision of the Every Student Succeeds Act, signed by the president in December 2015, in which Congress expressed that this boxing great should receive a posthumous pardon, and a vote by the United States Commission on Civil Rights passed unanimously a week earlier in June 2016 to "right this century-old wrong."

Mike Tyson, Harry Reid and John McCain lent their support to the campaign, starting a Change.org petition asking President Obama to posthumously pardon the world's first African-American Heavyweight boxing champion for his racially motivated 1913 felony conviction.

Monkey wrench
A persistent hoax on social media claims that Johnson invented the monkey wrench and it was named a monkey wrench as a racial slur. Johnson did receive a patent for improvements which he made to the monkey wrench,  but the name "monkey wrench" and the first patent for it predate his birth by over 35 years.

Death

On June 10, 1946, Johnson and a friend visited a segregated diner; when the diner refused to serve him, Johnson drove away angrily with his friend in the passenger seat. The car collided with a telegraph pole on U.S. Highway 1 near Franklinton, North Carolina. While his friend survived the crash, Johnson suffered fatal injuries and died later that day at St. Agnes Hospital in Raleigh, North Carolina, which was the nearest black hospital. He was 68 years old.

Johnson was buried at Graceland Cemetery in Chicago next to his first wife, Etta Duryea Johnson, who committed suicide in 1912. His grave was initially unmarked, but was later marked with a large tombstone which said only "Johnson". A new marker was added after filmmaker Ken Burns released a film about Johnson's life in 2005. Johnson's new, smaller gravestone reads: "Jack / John A. Johnson. 18781946. First black heavyweight champion of the world." Johnson's signature is on the back of the stone.

Legacy

Johnson was an inaugural 1954 inductee to The Ring magazine's Boxing Hall of Fame (disbanded in 1987), and was inducted to the International Boxing Hall of Fame in 1990. In 2005, the United States National Film Preservation Board deemed the film of the 1910 Johnson-Jeffries fight "historically significant" and put it in the National Film Registry.

During his boxing career, Jack Johnson fought 114 fights, winning 80 matches, 45 by knockouts. He also has the longest professional career of any world heavyweight boxing champion, having boxed for over 33 years from 1897 to 1931.

Muhammad Ali often spoke of how he was influenced by Jack Johnson. Ali identified with Johnson because he felt America ostracized him in the same manner because of his opposition to the Vietnam War and affiliation with the Nation of Islam.

In 2002, scholar Molefi Kete Asante listed Jack Johnson on his list of 100 Greatest African Americans.

In 2012, the City of Galveston dedicated a park in Johnson's memory as Galveston Island's most famous native son. The park, called Jack Johnson Park, includes a life-size, bronze statue of Johnson.

Actor and professional wrestler Dwayne "The Rock" Johnson's surname is an homage to Jack Johnson; his father, professional wrestler Rocky Johnson, was born with the surname "Bowles" and chose his ring name in honor of the boxer before making it his legal name.

Popular culture

The first filmed fight of Johnson's career was his bout with Tommy Burns, which was turned into a contemporary documentary, The Burns-Johnson Fight, in 1908.

Folksinger and blues singer Lead Belly referenced Johnson in a song about the Titanic: "Jack Johnson wanna get on board, Captain said I ain't hauling no coal. Fare thee, Titanic, fare thee well. When Jack Johnson heard that mighty shock, mighta seen the man do the Eagle rock. Fare thee, Titanic, fare thee well" (The Eagle Rock was a popular dance at the time). In 1969, American folk singer Jaime Brockett reworked the Lead Belly song into a satirical talking blues called "The Legend of the S.S. Titanic." There is no convincing evidence that Johnson was in fact refused passage on the Titanic because of his race, as these songs allege.

Johnson's story is the basis of the play The Great White Hope and its 1970 film adaptation, starring James Earl Jones as "Jack Jefferson" and Jane Alexander as his love interest. Both Jones and Alexander won Tonys and were nominated for Oscars.

Also in 1970, Jimmy Jacobs and Bill Cayton brought together much of the rare archive footage of Johnson which they had saved and restored, and made the film Jack Johnson, with Johnson's words voiced by Brock Peters, and music by Miles Davis. Davis' score later became the 1971 album named after the boxer. It features the actor Peters (as Johnson) saying:

In 2005, filmmaker Ken Burns produced a two-part documentary about Johnson's life, Unforgivable Blackness: The Rise and Fall of Jack Johnson, based on the 2004 nonfiction book of the same name by Geoffrey C. Ward, and with music by Wynton Marsalis. The book won the William Hill Sports Book of the Year (2006).

Jack Johnson's life was the subject of a three-part series of the podcast History on Fire by historian Daniele Bolelli.

Several hip hop activists have also reflected on Johnson's legacy, most notably in the album The New Danger, by Mos Def, in which songs like "Zimzallabim" and "Blue Black Jack" are devoted to the artist's pugilistic hero. In the closing track of the album Run the Jewels 3, "A Report to the Shareholders / Kill Your Masters," Killer Mike of the hip hop duo Run the Jewels reinvokes Jackson's image with the line: "I'm Jack Johnson, I beat a slave catcher snaggletooth." Additionally, both Southern punk rock band This Bike is a Pipe Bomb and alternative country performer Tom Russell have songs dedicated to Johnson. Russell's piece is both a tribute and a biting indictment of the racism Johnson faced: "here comes Jack Johnson, like he owns the town, there's a lot of white Americans like to see a man go down ... like to see a black man drown."

In the trenches of World War One, Johnson's name was used by British troops to describe the impact of German 150 mm heavy artillery shells which had a black color. In his letters home to his wife, Rupert Edward Inglis (1863–1916), a former rugby international who was a Forces Chaplain, describes passing through the town of Albert:

 We went through the place today (2 October 1915) where the Virgin Statue at the top of the Church was hit by a shell in January. The statue was knocked over, but has never fallen, I sent you a picture of it. It really is a wonderful sight. It is incomprehensible how it can have stayed there, but I think it is now lower than when the photograph was taken, and no doubt will come down with the next gale. The Church and village are wrecked, there's a huge hole made by a Jack Johnson just outside the west door of the Church.

Jack Johnson was painted several times by Raymond Saunders.

In Joe R. Lansdale's 1997 short story The Big Blow, Johnson is featured fighting a white boxer brought in by Galveston, Texas's boxing fans to defeat the African American fighter during the 1900 Galveston Hurricane. The story won a Bram Stoker Award and was expanded into a 2000 novel.

Johnson is a major character in the 2005 novel The Killings of Stanley Ketchel by James Carlos Blake.

The Royale, a play by Marco Ramirez, uses the life of Jack Johnson as inspiration for its main character, Jay Jackson. It premiered in March 2016 at Lincoln Center Theater directed by Rachel Chavkin, and was nominated for a Drama Desk Awards for Outstanding Play, Outstanding Director of a Play, and a Special Drama Desk Award for Outstanding Ensemble.

The book Crossing the Color Line: Stanley Ketchel's Challenge for Jack Johnson's Heavyweight Crown, written by Vernon Gravely and released in 2021, details Johnson's fight with middleweight champion Stanley Ketchel.

The graphic novel Last On His Feet: Jack Johnson and the Battle of the Century by Adrian Matejka and Youssef Daoudi, to be released in 2023, chronicles Johnson vs. Jeffries, interspersing the fight with flashbacks to Johnson's youth.

Professional boxing record
All information in this section is derived from BoxRec, unless otherwise stated.

Official record

All newspaper decisions are officially regarded as “no decision” bouts and are not counted in the win/loss/draw column.

Unofficial record

Record with the inclusion of newspaper decisions in the win/loss/draw column.

See also
 List of heavyweight boxing champions
 List of people pardoned or granted clemency by the president of the United States

References

Notes

Further reading
 Ocania Chalk, Pioneers of Black Sport. New York: Dodd, Mead, 1975.
 Henry Louis Gates and Cornel West, The African-American Century: How Black Americans have shaped our Country. New York: The Free Press, 2000.
 Theresa Runstedtler, Jack Johnson, Rebel Sojourner: Boxing in the Shadow of the Global Color Line. Berkeley, CA: University of California Press, 2012.

External links

 
 Jack Johnson at Flickr Commons
 ESPN Profile: Jack Johnson
 ESPN.com: Jack Johnson
 Unforgivable Blackness: The Rise and Fall of Jack Johnson, a 2 part film by Ken Burns and PBS 2005.
 Unforgivable Blackness: The Rise and Fall of Jack Johnson, A Review on Ken Burns' Documentary.
 Extended biography of Jack Johnson
 "The Johnson-Jeffries Fight and Censorship of Black Supremacy", by Barak Orbach.
 Famous Texans – Jack Johnson
 Harlem 1900–1940: Schomburg Exhibit Jack Johnson (archived)
 Flashback: Jack Johnson Profiled
 CBS News – A Pardon for Jack Johnson
 "Jeffries is Defeated; Dragged Out Bleeding". Daily Press, July 5, 1910. United States Library of Congress.
 BFI, Jack Johnson Paying a Visit to Manchester Docks, 1911
 Johnson-Jeffries Fight: A Centennial Exhibit, University Libraries, University of Nevada, Reno.
 Johnson-Jeffries Fight, Reno Historical
 Jack Johnson In the Ring and Out, Schomburg Center for Research in Black Culture, New York Public Library.

1878 births
1946 deaths
African-American boxers
American Freemasons
Ajax Records artists
Burials at Graceland Cemetery (Chicago)
History of racism in the United States
International Boxing Hall of Fame inductees
People convicted of violating the Mann Act
Sportspeople from Galveston, Texas
People who have received posthumous pardons
Racially motivated violence against African Americans
Road incident deaths in North Carolina
Vaudeville performers
World colored heavyweight boxing champions
World heavyweight boxing champions
American male boxers
Boxers from Texas
20th-century American criminals
Recipients of American presidential pardons
19th-century African-American people
20th-century African-American people
19th-century sportsmen
African-American history in Chicago